Critical point is a wide term used in many branches of mathematics.

When dealing with functions of a real variable, a critical point is a point in the domain of the function where the function is either not differentiable or the derivative is equal to zero. When dealing with complex variables, a critical point is, similarly, a point in the function's domain where it is either not holomorphic or the derivative is equal to zero. Likewise, for a function of several real variables, a critical point is a value in its domain where the gradient is undefined or is equal to zero.

The value of the function at a critical point is a critical value.

It extends further to differentiable maps between differentiable manifolds, as the points where the rank of the Jacobian matrix decreases. In this case, critical points are also called bifurcation points.

In other words, the critical points are those where the implicit function theorem does not apply.

The notion of a critical point allows the mathematical description of an astronomical phenomenon that was unexplained before the time of Copernicus. A stationary point in the orbit of a planet is a point of the trajectory of the planet on the celestial sphere, where the motion of the planet seems to stop before restarting in the other direction. This occurs because of a critical point of the projection of the orbit into the ecliptic circle.

Critical point of a single variable function
A critical point of a function of a single real variable, is a value  in the domain of  where  is not differentiable or its derivative is 0 (i.e.  A critical value is the image under  of a critical point. These concepts may be visualized through the graph of : at a critical point, the graph has a horizontal tangent if you can assign one at all.

Notice how, for a differentiable function, critical point is the same as stationary point.

Although it is easily visualized on the graph (which is a curve), the notion of critical point of a function must not be confused with the notion of critical point, in some direction, of a curve (see below for a detailed definition). If  is a differentiable function of two variables, then  is the implicit equation of a curve. If  is such a critical point, then  is the corresponding critical value.

It follows from these definitions that a differentiable function  has a critical point  with critical value , if and only if  is a critical point of its graph for the projection parallel to the -axis, with the same critical value y.

For example, the critical points of the unit circle of equation  are (0, 1) and (0, -1) for the projection parallel to the -axis, and (1, 0) and (-1, 0) for the direction parallel to the -axis.

Examples
The graph of the function  has a cusp at this point with vertical tangent. The corresponding critical value is 
 The absolute value function  is differentiable everywhere except at critical point , where it has a global minimum point, with critical value 0.
 The function  has no critical points. The point  is not a critical point because it is not included in the function's domain.

Location of critical points
By the Gauss–Lucas theorem, all of a polynomial function's critical points in the complex plane are within the convex hull of the roots of the function. Thus for a polynomial function with only real roots, all critical points are real and are between the greatest and smallest roots.

Sendov's conjecture asserts that, if all of a function's roots lie in the unit disk in the complex plane, then there is at least one critical point within unit distance of any given root.

Critical points of an implicit curve

Critical points play an important role in the study of plane curves defined by implicit equations, in particular for sketching them and determining their topology. The notion of critical point that is used in this section, may seem different from that of previous section. In fact it is the specialization to a simple case of the general notion of critical point given below.

Thus, we consider a curve  defined by an implicit equation , where  is a differentiable function of two variables, commonly a bivariate polynomial. The points of the curve are the points of the Euclidean plane whose Cartesian coordinates satisfy the equation. They are called the projection parallel to the y-axis and the projection parallel to the x-axis, respectively.

Thus a point is critical for  if its coordinates are solution of the system of equations:

This implies that this definition is a special case of the general definition of a critical point, which is given below.

It depends also on the authors if the singular points are considered as critical points. In fact the singular points are the points that satisfy

,

and are thus solutions of either system of equations characterizing the critical points.

Use of the discriminant
When the curve  is algebraic, that is when it is defined by a bivariate polynomial , then the discriminant is a useful tool to compute the critical points.

Let

A multiple root of the discriminant correspond either to several critical points or inflection asymptotes sharing the same critical value, or to a critical point which is also an inflection point, or to a singular point.

Several variables
The critical values are the values of the function at the critical points.

A critical point (where the function is differentiable) may be either a local maximum, a local minimum or a saddle point. If the function is at least twice continuously differentiable the different cases may be distinguished by considering the eigenvalues of the Hessian matrix of second derivatives.

A critical point at which the Hessian matrix is nonsingular is said to be nondegenerate, and the signs of the eigenvalues of the Hessian determine the local behavior of the function. In the case of a function of a single variable, the Hessian is simply the second derivative, viewed as a 1×1-matrix, which is nonsingular if and only if it is not zero. In this case, a non-degenerate critical point is a local maximum or a local minimum, depending on the sign of the second derivative, which is positive for a local minimum and negative for a local maximum. If the second derivative is null, the critical point is generally an inflection point, but may also be an undulation point, which may be a local minimum or a local maximum.

For a function of  variables, the number of negative eigenvalues of the Hessian matrix at a critical point is called the index of the critical point. For the other values of the index, a non-degenerate critical point is a saddle point, that is a point which is a maximum in some directions and a minimum in others.

Application to optimization

By Fermat's theorem, all local maxima and minima of a continuous function occur at critical points. Therefore, to find the local maxima and minima of a differentiable function, it suffices, theoretically, to compute the zeros of the gradient and the eigenvalues of the Hessian matrix at these zeros. This does not work well in practice because it requires the solution of a nonlinear system of simultaneous equations, which is a difficult task. The usual numerical algorithms are much more efficient for finding local extrema, but cannot certify that all extrema have been found.
In particular, in global optimization, these methods cannot certify that the output is really the global optimum.

When the function to minimize is a multivariate polynomial, the critical points and the critical values are solutions of a system of polynomial equations, and modern algorithms for solving such systems provide competitive certified methods for finding the global minimum.

Critical point of a differentiable map
The image of a critical point under  is a called a critical value. A point in the complement of the set of critical values is called a regular value. Sard's theorem states that the set of critical values of a smooth map has measure zero.

With this convention, all points are critical when .

These definitions extend to differential maps between differentiable manifolds in the following way.

Application to topology
Critical points are fundamental for studying the topology of manifolds and real algebraic varieties. In particular, they are the basic tool for Morse theory and catastrophe theory.

The link between critical points and topology already appears at a lower level of abstraction.

In the case of real algebraic varieties, this observation associated with Bézout's theorem allows us to bound the number of connected components by a function of the degrees of the polynomials that define the variety.

See also
 Singular point of a curve
 Singularity theory
 Gauss–Lucas theorem

References

Multivariable calculus
Smooth functions
Singularity theory